Sungkyunkwan was the foremost educational institution in Korea during the late Goryeo and Joseon Dynasties. Today, it sits in its original location, at the south end of the Humanities and Social Sciences Campus of Sungkyunkwan University in Seoul, South Korea. Twice a year, in May and September, the ceremonial rite Seokjeon Daeje is performed in the Munmyo Shrine, to honor Confucius and the Confucian sages of China and Korea.

Meaning of Sungkyunkwan 
Sung (RR: Seong) (성, 成) – accomplish, achieve. To become capable, successful or to win. “To perfect or develop human nature”.
Kyun (RR: Gyun) (균, 均) – balance, to be. Strengthen culture according to social standards or norms. “To build a good society”.
Kwan (RR: Gwan) (관, 館) – institute, academy, university.

Predecessors of Sungkyunkwan 
Taehak (태학, 太學, Great School) – founded in 372 during the reign of King Sosurim of Goguryeo
Gukhak (국학, 國學, National School) – founded in 682 by King Sinmun of Unified Silla

History of Sungkyunkwan 
Gukjagam (국자감, 國子監), the highest educational institution during the Goryeo Dynasty, was established in November 992 by King Seongjong in Goryeo's capital city, Gaegyeong (modern-day Kaesong). It was originally a palace outbuilding called Taemyon (태묜).

In 1089, under the reign of King Munjong, new official buildings were constructed.

Its name was changed to Seonggyungam (성균감) in 1298.

In 1304 it was reestablished by Neo-Confucian scholar An Hyang who is considered the founder of Neo-Confucianism in Korea.

The name was changed to Seonggyungwan in 1308 under reign of King Chungnyeol.

The name was changed back to Gukjagam in 1358 during the reign of King Gongmin.

In 1362 the name was changed back to Seonggyungwan.

After the founding of the Joseon Dynasty in 1392, King Taejo decided to relocate Sungkyunkwan to Hanyang, modern day Seoul, and in July 1398, he founded 360 Hyanggyo all over the country, establishing a national education system.

Sungkyunkwan was established in Hanyang on September 25, 1398.

A fire destroyed some buildings in 1400 which were rebuilt in 1407.

In 1418 King Taejong initiated a tradition for royal princes to enter Sungkyunkwan.

In 1472, Jeonsacheong was built.

In 1475, Jongyeonggak was built.

During the reign of the tyrannical King Yeongsangun, Sungkyunkwan was turned into a personal pleasure ground. When he was deposed, it was restored to its former status.

Sungkyunkwan was rebuilt again in 1601 after many buildings were burnt down (including the Munmyo area) during the Japanese invasions.

In 1636, Bicheondang, Ilyangjae, and Byeokipjae were built.

In 1743, Yugilgak was built.

In 1784, Byeokipjae (벽입재, 闢入齋) was destroyed by a fire. It is no longer present on the current campus grounds.

In 1869 there was a major renovation/restoration of the old campus.

In 1894 the Gabo Reform occurred which abolished the national state examinations during the reign of King Gojong.

In 1895, Sungkyunkwan was reformed into a modern three-year university.

During the colonial era (between 1910 and 1945), Sungkyunkwan was demoted to a private institution and renamed Gyeonghagwon (경학원, 經學院), while Korean education was prohibited and Japanese education was forced nationwide.

After Korea gained independence in 1945, Gyeonghagwon's original name was restored and with funding from Yurim (Confucians) nationwide, Sungkyunkwan University was established.

During the Korean War (June 25, 1950 – July 27, 1953), much of the campus was destroyed. Daeseongjeon, however, remained.

In 1954 Gyeseongsa (계성사, 啓聖祠) was removed. Gyeseongsa was the shrine for the parents of the Confucian sages. It used to house the spirit tablets of the important family members of Confucian scholars.

The latest renovation occurred in 1988.

There was Japanese-style landscaping throughout the old campus left over from the colonial era that was eventually removed over the most recent decades to restore Sungkyunkwan to its original Joseon-era form.

Buildings, structures, and features 
Myeongnyundang (명륜당, 明倫堂): The name means "Hall of Enlightenment". It was originally built in 1398. The center room was used for ceremonies, lectures, rituals, tests, and other important events. The two smaller rooms were used for faculty research and private meetings. It is depicted on the 1,000 KRW bill. 
Daeseongjeon (대성전, 大成殿): The name means "Great Achievement Hall". The current version of the building was reconstructed in 1602 and restored many times. The calligraphy on the sign board on the building is the work of Han Seok-bong, one of the greatest calligraphers of the Joseon Dynasty. It is the main building of Munmyo Shrine and houses the spirit tablets of the notable Confucian scholars from China and Korea. Thirty-nine of the tablets held in Munmyo are inside Daeseongjeon which include Confucius, the four Chinese nobles, and the eighteen Korean sages. Originally, Chinese Confucians were revered more but since 1945, a greater emphasis has been placed on the important Korean scholars. The purpose of the building and the courtyard area is to facilitate Confucian rituals and ceremonies designed to honor Confucius and the notable scholars since filial piety is an essential aspect of Confucian philosophy.
Dongmu (동무, 東 廡): This building makes up the eastern side of Munmyo. It was used to store the spirit tablets of Confucian scholars and other important relics. There used to be 133 tablets that were housed in Daeseongjeon, Dongmu, and Seomu but the amount was decreased to focus more on the Korean sages. Since it is located to the east, more important tablets and relics were kept inside. It is connected to the main entrance of the site, Dongsammun (Eosammun), on its north side.
Seomu (서무, 西 廡): This building makes up the western side of Munmyo.
Dongsammun (동삼문) or Eosammun (어삼문): This was the main entrance of Sungkyunkwan which is located on the east side. It was designed with three square doorways which was the style at the time. The entrance is not dressed up with the ornate decorations or a special roof which further emphasizes the Confucian concept of humility.
Sinsammun (신삼문): The name means "Spirit Three Door/Gate". The purpose of the gate is not to be used for the entrance of living people but for the spirits of the Confucian sages and scholars to pass through. The doors are only opened during important ceremonies.
East Malmun (동말문, 東末門): This is the door people enter in during ceremonies. 
West Malmun (서말문, 西末門): This is the door people exit from during ceremonies.
Dongjae (동재, 東齋): This was the eastern dormitory. It makes up the eastern side of the courtyard in front of Myeongnyundang. Those students that were royalty stayed in the eastern dormitory due to east being the favored direction. Also those from the more dominant political factions or those from Hanyang would stay in Dongjae too.
Seojae (서재, 西齋): This was the western dormitory. It makes up the western side of the courtyard in front of Myeongnyundang. The students from the areas outside of Hanyang or the less dominant political faction stayed there.
Jongyeonggak (존경각, 尊經閣): The name means, "To revere the classics highly." It was originally constructed in 1475 during the reign of King Seongjong. It was the only university library in Korea until 1900. Volumes housed in the library were exclusively Confucian books. During the Japanese occupation, most of the books were taken to the library of Keijō Imperial University, the predecessor of Seoul National University, and the remaining books were moved to the Central Library of Sungkyunkwan University after the completion of the new campus in 1953.
Jeongnokcheong (정록청, 正錄廳): This was the administration office building, serving as the office for the head of the school and its administrators. It is not painted royal red but it has a doorway from the main entrance that was purposefully made lower so that those who passed through were forced to bow out of respect. It is designated National Korean Historic Site No. 143.
Jikbang (직방, 直房): This is a rectangular structure that acted as a waiting area.
Seolicheong (서리청, 書吏廳): This structure was for the office clerks working for Sungkyunkwan's Administrative Office.
Changgo (창고) or Seobyeokgo (서벽고): This building was for the people who managed the carriages and horses for transportation and the storage of the necessary tools and materials involved.
Bibokcheong (비복청, 婢僕廳, Servant Hall): This building was used by the servants at Sungkyunkwan.
Hyanggwancheong (향관청, 享官廳): This building was originally used to store incense and written ritual prayers, but eventually it was used for as an office for those who presided over the ancestral rites.
Seowollang (서월랑, 西月廊): This building was used by the inspectors in charge of inspection of Sungkyunkwan.
Dongwollang (동월랑, 東月廊): This building was also used by the inspectors.
Jinsasikdang (진사식당, 食堂): The area where students had their meals and where attendance was taken. Students needed 300 points to take the national civil service examinations to graduate and one of the ways they got them was by attending meals.
Jaegigo (제기고, 祭器庫): This structure was for storing the materials for the rituals performed in Munmyo such as the plates used to hold the food that was offered as sacrifice to the sages.
Yugilgak (육일각, 六一閣): This building was used to store sporting equipment, mainly archery tools such as bows and arrows.
Subokcheong (수복청, 守僕廳): This building was the office for the people in charge of preparing rituals as well as restoration and grounds-keeping of Sungkyunkwan.
Jeonsacheong (전사청, 典祀廳): This building was used to prepare the food that was sacrificed and hold the vessels for the rituals performed in Munmyo.
Poju (포주, 庖廚): This is the kitchen where the sacrificial food was prepared for the rituals at the shrine.
Bicheondang (비천당): This was the State Exam Hall. It was originally built in 1664 and was reconstructed in 1988. The name means, “Enlightening the great way,” which is cited from the famous Confucian, Zhu Xi. It has a unique intricately-painted ceiling. The questions of the exam would be written on a large scroll out front and the students would answer them in essay form while sitting on the ground as an act of humility.
Myojeongbigak (묘정비각, 廟庭碑): This small structure is a shelter for a monument of Confucius. There is a large stone turtle contained within with a large stone tablet on its back with a sizeable amount of hanja calligraphy engraved on it. The stone turtle symbolizes the longevity of Sungkyunkwan and Confucianism.
Tangpyeongbigak (탕평비각): This monument was erected in 1742 with a stone stele inside bearing a message from King Yeongjo that states, “The mind of a nobleman embraces all segments without dividing them into factions, while the mind of an unworthy is incapable of embracing all segments and divides them into factions.” The message is a reference to how the king would appoint officials without regard for political affiliation according to the “policy of impartiality” known as "Tangpyeong (탕평)".
Ginkgo trees: The two oldest ginkgo trees in Sungkyunkwan (Natural Monument No. 59) were planted in 1519 by Yun Tak, the head instructor at the time. The ginkgo leaf is the modern symbol of Sungkyunkwan University. It is said that Confucius liked to instruct his students under the shade of ginkgo trees. All trees in Sungkyunkwan are male, not bearing fruit, as the institution originally forbade any females from entering. Also, the fruit of the ginkgo produces an unpleasant smell.
Hayeondae (하연대): This was a parking place for sedan chairs. This is where the king left his palanquin before entering the campus.
Hamabi (하마비): This was a dismounting point. Anyone who was on horseback or in a palanquin would have to dismount or disembark before passing this stone tablet. The inscription loosely means, “Passing into a holy place”.

There are also some buildings, structures, and features that were removed:
Gyeseongsa (계성사, 啓聖祠): This structure was the shrine for the parents of the Confucian sages. It used to house the tablets of the important family members of Confucian scholars.
Ilyangjae (일양재, 一兩齋): This building along with Byeongipjae was along the western wall of Sungkyunkwan on the side of the courtyard in front of Bicheondang where students would take exams. It was used for ritualistic purposes.
Byeokipjae (벽입재, 闢入齋): This building was just south of Ilyangjae and was also used for Confucian rituals most-likely associated with the taking of examinations.
Bansu (반수, Stream in front of Sungkyunkwan): There was once a small stream running around the front exterior of Sungkyunkwan. The location of water to the south is in line with Chinese Feng Shui (풍수, 風水, Pungsu) aesthetics that were popular at the time that emphasize certain natural elements as a way of ensuring the proper flow of qi throughout a structure.
Bansugyo (반수교, 泮橋) or Bangyo (반교): This was the entrance bridge that went over Bansu Stream. The area to the east of Sungkyunkwan was named after the bridge. This area was associated with providing services for the school.

Design features 
The old campus was designed based on geomancy. Sungkyunkwan was built with the mountains behind it to the north and the front facing south towards water (the Han River and Bansu, the creek that used to run around the front of the campus). This was based on superstition as well as function. The sunlight and wind patterns were considered most ideal when the buildings were arranged this way.

The buildings are constructed of red pine which was considered very special in the Joseon Dynasty and laypeople were forbidden from logging them. Korean aristocrats believed red pine represented the Confucian virtues of “fidelity” and “fortitude”. Today, red pine is mentioned in the South Korean national anthem “Aegukga” (애국가, 愛國歌).

The windows were made using window paper (한지, 韓紙, Hanji). The paper used was handmade from the inner bark of paper mulberry which grows on rocky Korean mountainsides (닥). This was combined with the mucilage that oozes from the roots of abelmoschus manihot which helps suspend the individual fibers in water. The hanji is made in laminated sheets using the webal (외발) sheet formation method allowing for a multi-directional grain. The finished sheets are then pounded using a method called dochim (도침) to compact the fibers and lessen ink bleed.

The stone platforms (기단, Gidan) used for several of Sungkyunkwan's buildings are made of rectangular granite slabs fit together into a rectangular structure. The height of the platforms symbolizes the importance of the buildings. Much of the stonework from the original construction of the buildings remains exposed. There is also a sizeable percentage that is still present but has been buried beneath the structures due to time and renovations/reconstructions.

Platform stones (주춧돌, Juchutdol) are stones in which pillars rest on. They block humidity from the ground as well as bear the load of the pillars in order to efficiently redistribute the weight of the building to the ground.

The timber-framed structures contain such components as:
Crossbeam (보, Bo) – Horizontal crossbeam placed perpendicularly to the pillars to support the load of the roof. Large bo are called daebeulbo or daeryang.
Purlin (도리, Dori) – Wood pieces that support a rafter at a right angle from the bo.
Rafter (서까래, Seokkarae, aka 연목, Yeonmok) – The horizontal sides of a roof made of thin and long wood pieces whose edges form the eaves.
King Post (대공, Daegong) – A short post that supports the ridgepole.
Eaves (처마, Cheoma) – The portion of the rafters that extends beyond the pillar supporting it from underneath. The  are long to provide more shade from the high sun in summer months while in the winter, the low sun can still penetrate deep into the interior of the house. The deep eaves also prevent warm indoor air from escaping from the heated floor. To make the eaves look less heavy, they are lifted at the corners forming the distinctive curved lines.
The different types of pillars (기둥, Gidung) used are:
Wide Based Pillar (민흘림기둥, Minheullim Gidung)
Straight Pillar (징닙주기둥, Jingnipju Gidung, aka 원통기둥, Wontong Gidung)
Entasis Pillar (배흘림기둥, Baehaeullim Gidung)
Straight Pillar (각기둥, Gak Gidung) 
The types of wooden flooring are:
Veranda (툇마루, Toenmaru)
Balcony (누마루, Numaru)
Checkered Floor (우물마루, Umulmaru) – Wooden floors were designed in this pattern to compensate for the expansion and contraction of the wood due to changes in temperature and moisture in order to avoid warping of the wood.
Main Hall (대청마루, Daecheongmaru) – The name means “Big Floor”. 
Long-plank Floor (장마루, Jangmaru)
The floors of many of the buildings were equipped with ondol traditional radiant floor heating.

The buildings are painted based on the Korean art of painting buildings which is called Dancheong (단청) which means “red and green”. The incorporation of the five elements epitomizes ancient Korean's desire for stability and peace in the present life and a rewarding afterlife. The brightly colored paint on buildings is not only for decoration, it is also for protecting the buildings from weather, rot, vermin, and evil spirits as well as emphasize the authority of their residents. The red-colored paint on Sungkyunkwan's buildings symbolizes nobility. Only the most important buildings are painted red. There are five basic colors: blue, red, black, white, and yellow which symbolize the five traditional elements. Blue means east, dragon, spring, and wood. Red means south, birds, summer, and fire. White means west, tiger, fall, and gold. Black means north, hyeonmu, winter, and water. Yellow means center, the periods between seasons, and Earth.

The roofs (Jibung, 지붕) are made of clay tiles (기와, Giwa) and are decorated with figurines called japsang (잡상). There is always an odd number of the smaller japsang. The most a building can have is 11. The purpose of the roof decorations goes back to the Korean shamanic religion and they are intended to chase away evil spirits and misfortune as well as show the dignity and grandeur of a building. The first few japsang on a roof are usually characters from the Chinese classic Journey to the West. The types of japsang are:
Dragon's Head (용두, Yongdu)
Eagle's Head (취두, Chwuidu)
Owl's Tail (치미, Chimi)
Buddhist Monk (대당사부, 玄奘, Daedangsabu, Xuanzang)
Monkey King (손행자, 孫悟空, Sonhaengja, Sun Wukong)
Friar Sand “Sandy” (사화상, 沙悟凈, Sahwasang, Shā Wùjìng)
Igwibak (이귀박)
Iguryong (이구룡)
Mahwasang (마화상)
Bodhisattva (삼살보살, Samsalbosal)
Cheonsangap (천산갑)
Natodu (나토두)

Courtyards (안마당, Anmadang) were an important aspect of Joseon Dynasty architecture. They served a practical purpose of allowing large groups to congregate for meetings and activities. Beyond this, they fulfilled the Joseon aesthetic principle of the pure beauty of empty space. Korean buildings were designed to be in close harmony with nature which is reflected in many ways, none more so than in the use of courtyards, complete with trees and vegetation, within the walled-in areas.

The name signboards on structures (간판, Ganpan) are large wooden signs written in Hanja and served to identify them as well as display their importance. More important buildings had special names and their signs were larger and more decorative.

The windows (창문, Changmun) were made of wooden frames lined with hanji paper allowing for natural air to penetrate through the windows as well natural light to enter the room. The height and size of windows was based on the standard height and shoulder width of an adult person. The height of window frames was designed to be low enough to rest an elbow on but high enough to conceal a person lying down.

Education 
The primary written language of Sungkyunkwan was hanja. Although hangul was invented in 1443, it did not become the primary language of study because the literary elite believed that the difficult hanja was more sophisticated. Hangul was invented to solve the widespread illiteracy of the common people at the time, but it was considered a threat by many in the upper class to their status as literary scholars, leading them to resist its implementation. As a result, hanja remained the written language used at Sungkyunkwan requiring anyone who wished to rise to the top levels of the government to be capable of reading and writing the characters.

Sungkyunkwan's teachings were mainly Confucian-related, and were primarily aimed at preparing students for government service. Students also studied law, medicine, interpretation, accounting, archery, mathematics, music, and etiquette.

The main goal was for the students to pass the higher national civil service examinations (gwageo). Like their Chinese counterpart, these examinations were on writing ability, knowledge of the Confucian classics, and proposals of management of the state (governance). Technical subjects were also included to appoint experts in medicine, interpretation, accounting, and law.

Poetry was a big part of both the students’ studies and communication. It was viewed as noble and proof of the students’ high-born lineage. They were heavily encouraged to read and compose poetry.

The students were required to write lengthy essays on a regular basis that were subject to strict criticism from their instructors. The middle ten days of every month were dedicated to literary exercises. There were regular tests every 10 days and there were also daily quizzes.

The original set number of students was 150 when Sungkyunkwan was founded, which was raised to 200 in 1429. All of the students were male and women were forbidden from entering the campus.

Books on Buddhism and Taoism were banned.

Joseon Era students attended Seodang from ages 5 or 6 where they learned rudimentary penmanship, basic essential skills, and the Chinese classics. The students’ education began with reading the "Thousand Character Classic". The teaching methodology emphasized rote learning by reading and memorizing an assigned passage each day. Once a student read something more than one hundred times, they would recite it to their teacher (훈장, Hunjang). At age 15 or 16 students entered hyanggyo or seowon (서원, 書院, Private primary school) for advanced studies targeted on passing examinations. They would study there for five or six years.

Entrance examinations for Sungkyunkwan were extremely harsh and were only allowed for the sons of yangban, the Joseon era upper class or royalty. There were two ways to be accepted into Sungkyunkwan. Either the students had to pass the two admission exams, Saengwonsi (생원시) and Jinsasi (진사시), or take the other two examinations, Seungbo (승보) and Eumseo (음서). If they passed these examinations, they were given the opportunity to be accepted.

Students lived very comfortably on full scholarship and were waited on by servants.

Students were informed of the time throughout the day by drum beats. One beat indicated the time to get up (6:00 AM every day), two beats meant it was time to dress neatly and read, and three beats meant it is meal time.

In the early morning, when the drum was sounded signaling the start of the day, students would prostrate themselves once before entering Myeongnyundang to receive a lecture on Confucianism.

Classes were held at the Lecture Hall from 10:00 AM to 10:00 PM.

The students were divided into 2 classes based on academic abilities.

If students received low marks they were punished and publicly humiliated.

Students would sneak out after 10:00 PM to study more.

Students would sometimes appeal to the king about unjust decisions and if they were rejected they would stage political demonstrations, fast, or boycott classes.

The 8th and 23rd days of each month were washing days for the student's clothing.

The students' uniforms were originally red then changed to sky blue to symbolize the endless spring of knowledge.

Throughout the Joseon era the students were divided into multiple political factions (붕당, 朋黨, Bungdang) that influenced the national politics and the study of Neo-Confucianism. Originally the Hungu faction was the most dominant and the more radical Sarim faction was often subject to violent purges to eliminate political opponents. Eventurally the Sarim became the dominant faction. The Sarim, however, split many times into smaller factions over the following centuries due to political in-fighting. The students at Sungkyunkwan would often play important roles in these political conflicts.

During Joseon, the highest aspiration those in the upper class could have was to be a seonbi (선비, Virtuous Scholar). They believed that the more important way to improve oneself was through continuous study while adhering to the principles of Confucianism. Much of this can still be seen in modern Korean culture's emphasis on the importance of education and respect for one's elders or superiors.

The requirements for graduation included:
300 Points (원점, Wonjeom) from Dogi (도기, Student Attendance Book) needed to be qualified to take the advanced state exams to graduate (1 point per sign-in)
Passing the state civil-service examinations
No fixed date for graduation
Only 30 students were allowed to graduate each year out of the 50 selected to take the exams.

Noteworthy facts 
The king, as a disciple before Confucius, would take off his royal robes and wear plain clothes before stepping into the courtyard of the Confucian Shrine. The kings would usually never set foot on the ground outside of the palaces anywhere but Sungkyunkwan.

The path between Sinsammun and Daeseongjeon was originally considered sacred and only for the spirits. People were not allowed to step on it or face punishment. Even today the Confucian keepers of the shrine bow before stepping on it.

Students were not allowed to have pets.

Alcohol consumption was allowed within reason and students were sometimes given liquor or wine as a present.

The worst offense a student could commit, resulting in them not being allowed to take the state exams was not showing instructors proper respect or making disparaging remarks about them.

The students had the right to protest which they often did for various academic and political reasons.

Yi I, a famous Joseon scholar and politician is an alumnus and is featured on the 5,000 won bill.

King Sejong is an alumnus and is featured on the 10,000 won bill.

Shin Saimdang, Yi I's mother, is on the 50,000 won bill.

Chojip (초집) were how-to guide booklets used by cheaters.

The sodu (소두) was the chairman of a committee who would put forth appeals to the king.

The students' class list was called the cheonggeumnok (청금곡, 靑矜錄, Blue Robe Book).

Sungkyunkwan in fiction 

Sungkyunkwan was featured prominently in the popular Korean drama Sunkyunkwan Scandal.
Sungkyunkwan scholars stage a wailing protest in episode 11 of Rookie Historian Goo Hae-ryung.

Images

Notable alumni
Yi Gae (1417–1456): entered in 1436. One of the six martyred ministers, who took part in the compilation of Dongguk Jeongun.
Hwang Hui (1363–1452): Chief State Councillor during the reign of Sejong the Great.
Jeong In-ji (1396–1478): entered in 1411. Confucian scholar and historian who served as Chief State Councillor during the early Joseon period.
Choe Hang (1409–1474): entered in 1434. Confucian scholar who participated in the creation of Hangul, and the compilation of Dongguk Tonggam and Gyeongguk Daejeon.
Munjong of Joseon (1414–1452): entered in 1421. Fifth monarch of the Joseon Dynasty and the first Crown Prince to enter Sungkyunkwan.
Shin Suk-ju (1417–1475): entered in 1438. Government official and linguist who participated in the creation of Hangul and served as Chief State Councillor.
Sejo of Joseon (1414–1468): entered in 1430. Seventh monarch of the Joseon Dynasty. The National Code (the first form of constitutional law in a written form in Korea) was compiled during his reign.
Kim Jong-jik (1431–1492): entered in 1453. Leading Confucian scholar during the early Joseon period.
Jo Gwang-jo (1482–1519): entered in 1510. Radical reformer and one of the 18 Sages of Korea, who was sentenced to death during the Third Literati Purge.
Yi Hwang (1501–1570): entered in 1523. Confucian scholar and government official who wrote the Seonghak Sipdo ("The Ten Diagrams of Sage Learning") and set up Dosan Seowon.
Hyujeong (1520–1604): entered in 1537. Buddhist monk famous for the guerrilla units he organized during the Japanese Invasions of 1592–1598.
Yi I (1536–1584): entered in 1558. Philosopher, social reformer, government official and writer. Third son of Shin Saimdang.
Ryu Seong-ryong (1542–1607): entered in 1565. Confucian scholar and government official. He wrote Jingbirok and served as Chief State Councillor during the Japanese Invasions.
Kim Jang-saeng (1548–1631): entered in 1623. Confucian scholar, government official and educator.
Yun Seon-do (1587–1671): entered in 1612. Confucian scholar, philosopher and government official. Considered the greatest master of sijo poetry.
Heo Mok (1587–1682): entered in 1675. Painter, philosopher, poet and government official. Known as the best Chinese calligrapher of his time.
Yun Hyu (1617–1680): entered in 1675. Confucian scholar and government official.
Gwon Sang-ha (1641–1721): entered 1660. Confucian scholar and government official who served as Left State Councillor.
Park Mun-su (1691–1756): Government official and the most famous Secret Royal Inspector.
Yeongjo of Joseon (1694–1776): entered in 1722. 21st and longest reigning monarch of the Joseon Dynasty. He implemented the Tangpyeongchaek ("Policy of Impartiality") and the Gyunyeokbeop ("Equalized Tax Law").
Jeongjo of Joseon (1752–1800): entered in 1761. 22nd monarch of Joseon, often considered one of the greatest rulers of the dynasty alongside King Sejong. Founder of Kyujanggak.
Jeong Yak-yong (1762–1836): entered in 1783. Government official, agronomist and poet. A close confidant of King Jeongjo, he is one of the greatest thinkers of the late Joseon period, whose philosophical position is often identified with the Silhak movement. He wrote highly influential books about science, theory of government and philosophy, including Mongmin Simseo and Gyeongse Yupyo.
Park Gyu-su (1807–1877): entered in 1827. Confucian scholar, teacher, government official and diplomat. Known as a pioneer of the enlightenment faction. He served as Right State Councillor.
Choe Ik-hyeon (1833–1906): entered in 1854. Government official, philosopher and general of the Righteous Army.
Kim Ok-gyun (1851–1894): entered in 1872. Reformist and activist during the late Joseon period. One of the leaders of the Gapsin Coup.
Park Eun-sik (1859–1925): Historian and the second President of the Provisional Government of the Republic of Korea. Wrote the Hanguk Tongsa ("Painful History of Korea").
Yi Dong-nyeong (1869–1940): entered in 1892. Independence activist and President of the Provisional Government of the Republic of Korea.
Shin Chae-ho (1880–1936): Independence activist, historian, anarchist and a founder of Korean nationalist historiography. Two of his books, Doksa Sillon ("A New Reading of History") and Chosǒn Sanggosa ("The Early History of Joseon"), are considered key works of nationalist historiography in modern Korea.
Jo So-ang (1887–1959): entered 1902. Politician and educator during the Japanese occupation, who participated in the independence movement. He contributed to the draft of the proclamation of independence in 1918.

See also
Education in the Joseon Dynasty
History of Education
Gukhak
Gukjagam
Songgyungwan (Kaesong)
Sungkyunkwan University
Beijing Guozijian

References

External links
Official website 
Sungkyunkwan University
Munmyo Korean Tourism Site

Education in the Joseon dynasty
Tourist attractions in Seoul
14th-century establishments in Korea
1398 establishments in Asia
Jongno District
Korean Confucianism